(Remember Me) I'm the One Who Loves You is a 1965 studio album by Dean Martin, produced by Jimmy Bowen and arranged by Ernie Freeman. The album was Martin's fifth album to appear in the Top 40, and peaked at number 12 on the Billboard Top LPs chart. The album's release in September 1965 corresponded with the debut of Martin's long-running TV series The Dean Martin Show.

The album was reissued on CD by Hip-O Records in 2009.

Reception

William Ruhlmann on AllMusic gave the album three stars out of five, commenting on the "Formula" developed by Bowen for Martin's sound, of "piano triplets, a 4/4 beat, swooping strings, a female chorus." Ruhlman added that "...The country market never bit at these records, but Martin had a clutch of material that sounded fresh to pop fans. And, the liner notes notwithstanding, Bowen and Freeman knew that the time had come to vary the formula."

Track listing

Personnel 
 Dean Martin – vocals
 Ernie Freeman – arranger
 Jimmy Bowen – producer
 Ed Thrasher – photography

References 

1965 albums
Dean Martin albums
Albums arranged by Ernie Freeman
Albums produced by Jimmy Bowen
Reprise Records albums